Donnelley/Depue State Fish and Wildlife Area is an Illinois state park on  in Putnam County, Illinois, United States.

References

State parks of Illinois
Protected areas of Putnam County, Illinois
Protected areas established in 1982
1982 establishments in Illinois